Building at 218 High Street is a historic store and dwelling located in Seaford, Sussex County, Delaware. It was built about 1885, and is a two-story, two bay structure with a gable roof. It features a multipaned showcase window on the front facade. It was built as a residence and was converted to commercial use about 1910.

It was added to the National Register of Historic Places in 1987.

References

Commercial buildings on the National Register of Historic Places in Delaware
Houses on the National Register of Historic Places in Delaware
Buildings and structures completed in 1910
Buildings and structures in Sussex County, Delaware
Seaford, Delaware
National Register of Historic Places in Sussex County, Delaware